The national federations of the UCI form confederations by continent. In Asia, this body is the Asian Cycling Confederation, also shortened to ACC.

Presidents

Member Federations
As of September 2022, the ACC consists of 45 member federations, following Bhutan's admission to the UCI. The ACC is henceforth represented in all member countries of the Olympic Council of Asia.

Representative from Asia to UCI Management Committee

References

External links 
 Asian Cycling Confederation

Cycle racing organizations
Union Cycliste Internationale
Sports governing bodies in Asia
Cycle racing in Asia